Group A of the 2002 Fed Cup Europe/Africa Zone Group I was one of four pools in the Europe/Africa Zone Group I of the 2002 Fed Cup. Four teams competed in a round robin competition, with the top two teams advancing to the play-offs and the bottom team being relegated down to Group II for 2003.

Slovenia vs. Ukraine

Belarus vs. Greece

Slovenia vs. Greece

Ukraine vs. Belarus

Slovenia vs. Belarus

Ukraine vs. Greece

  failed to win any ties in the pool, and thus was relegated to Group II in 2003, where they achieved promotion back to Group I for 2004.

See also
Fed Cup structure

References

External links
 Fed Cup website

2002 Fed Cup Europe/Africa Zone